Defiance is a city in Shelby County, Iowa, United States, along the West Branch of the West Nishnabotna River. The population was 245 at the time of the 2020 census.

History
Defiance had its start in 1882 by the building of the Chicago, Milwaukee, and St. Paul Railroad through that territory.

Geography
Defiance is located at  (41.824740, -95.342056).

Demographics

2010 census
As of the census of 2010, there were 284 people, 121 households, and 82 families residing in the city. The racial makeup of the city was 98.9% White, 0.4% Native American, 0.4% Asian, and 0.4% from other races. Hispanic or Latino of any race were 1.4% of the population.

There were 121 households, of which 25.6% had children under the age of 18 living with them, 61.2% were married couples living together, 3.3% had a female householder with no husband present, 3.3% had a male householder with no wife present, and 32.2% were non-families. 28.9% of all households were made up of individuals, and 10.8% had someone living alone who was 65 years of age or older. The average household size was 2.35 and the average family size was 2.90.

The median age in the city was 47.8 years. 23.6% of residents were under the age of 18; 4.2% were between the ages of 18 and 24; 17.3% were from 25 to 44; 38.8% were from 45 to 64; and 16.2% were 65 years of age or older. The gender makeup of the city was 51.1% male and 48.9% female.

2000 census
As of the census of 2000, there were 346 people, 125 households, and 98 families residing in the city. The racial makeup of the city was 95.95% White, 1.16% Native American, 2.89% from other races. Hispanic or Latino of any race were 2.89% of the population.

There were 125 households, out of which 40.0% had children under the age of 18 living with them, 69.6% were married couples living together, 8.0% had a female householder with no husband present, and 20.8% were non-families. 19.2% of all households were made up of individuals, and 8.8% had someone living alone who was 65 years of age or older. The average household size was 2.77 and the average family size was 3.16.

In the city, the population was spread out, with 30.9% under the age of 18, 5.2% from 18 to 24, 28.0% from 25 to 44, 22.0% from 45 to 64, and 13.9% who were 65 years of age or older. The median age was 37 years. For every 100 females, there were 106.0 males. For every 100 females age 18 and over, there were 106.0 males.

The median income for a household in the city was $36,875, and the median income for a family was $40,125. Males had a median income of $25,673 versus $18,750 for females. The per capita income for the city was $12,492. About 4.1% of families and 7.0% of the population were below the poverty line, including 6.2% of those under age 18 and 4.2% of those age 65 or over.

Education
The Harlan Community School District operates local public schools.  The district serves the towns of Harlan, Defiance, Earling, Panama, Portsmouth and Westphalia, the unincorporated communities of Jacksonville and Corley, and the surrounding rural areas.

Notable people
 Dixie Shanahan, Snapped Murderer
 C. A. Robins, 22nd Governor of Idaho; born in Defiance.
 Craig Muhlbauer, a Denver tax accountant originally from Defiance, appeared on the tenth season of The Bachelorette on ABC, but lasted only two episodes.

References

External links
 
City-Data.com Comprehensive Statistical Data and more about Defiance

Cities in Iowa
Cities in Shelby County, Iowa